Aulae or Aulai was a town in ancient Cilicia, and now is an archaeological site close to Mersin, Turkey.

Geography
The site seems to be situated in Kazanlı, a neighborhood of Mersin.

History
Stephanus of Byzantium had mentioned Aulae as a port of Cilicia between Tarsus and Anchiale, which was a settlement close to Zephyrion (present Mersin centrum). Although Hansgerd Hellenkemper initially proposed a place slightly west of Kazanlı for Aulae, recent findings fixed Kazanlı as the location of Aulae.

Findings
Up to 2012, the only place of historical importance in Kazanlı was that of Topraktepe tumulus to the north of the settlement. In 2012, a group of amphoras were found in Kazanlı close to Mediterranean coast. Most of the amphoras were LR1 (Late Roman) amphoras. There were also LR4 amphoras as well. The amount of amphoras suggest a ceramics production workshop and a busy port. Thus according to Murat Durukan of Mersin University, Kazanlı can be identified with Aulae.

References

Archaeological sites in Mersin Province, Turkey
Former populated places in Turkey
Ancient Greek archaeological sites in Turkey
Ancient ports and harbours
Byzantine Anatolia
Akdeniz District
Populated places in ancient Cilicia